The 2018 MPBL season is the inaugural season of the Maharlika Pilipinas Basketball League. For the tournament for this season was named the Rajah Cup, also known as the Anta–Rajah Cup after sponsor Anta Sports. The tournament opened on January 25, 2018, at the Smart Araneta Coliseum, Quezon City. After the opening ceremonies, the game between Parañaque Patriots and Caloocan Supremos immediately followed. All games were aired on ABS-CBN Sports (ABS-CBN Sports and Action Channel 23 & HD Channel 166). The tournament ended on April 19 with the Batangas City Athletics defeating Muntinlupa Cagers in the 2018 MPBL Rajah Cup Finals.

Format 
The format for the cup was:
 The ten teams will play in a single-round robin group stage, with each team playing against the other teams once. Teams are then be seeded based on win–loss records.
 After the regular season, teams are ranked based on their win-loss records. The top eight teams advance to the playoffs. Should there be any ties between teams, FIBA tiebreaker rules shall be applied.
 The first two rounds of the playoffs is a best-of-three series, while the MPBL Finals is a best-of-five championship series.
 In each playoff match, the higher-seeded team earns homecourt advantage for the round. That team will then host games 1 and 3 in the Quarterfinals and Semifinals, and games 1, 2, and 5 in the Finals, with the lower-seeded team hosting the other games.
 The winning team from each playoff series advances to the next round until the Finals, where the winning team is declared the season's champions.

Notable events 
 January 25 – Daniel San Juan de Guzman of Parañaque Patriots became the first player to make a basket in the opening game.

Eliminations

Team Standings

Schedule

Results

Playoffs

Bracket

Quarter-finals

QF1: (No. 1) Batangas City Athletics vs. (No. 8) Bataan Defenders

QF2: (No. 2) Bulacan Kuyas vs. (No. 7) Parañaque Patriots

QF3: (No. 3) Muntinlupa Cagers vs. (No. 6) Navotas Clutch

QF4: (No. 4) Valenzuela Classic vs. (No. 5) Quezon City Capitals

Semi-finals

SF1: Batangas City Athletics vs. Valenzuela Classic

SF2: Parañaque Patriots vs. Muntinlupa Cagers

MPBL Finals

Statistics

Individual statistic leaders

Individual game highs

Team statistic leaders (group stage)

References

External links 
 MPBL Official Website

2018 MPBL season
2017–18 in Philippine basketball leagues